Hypnodendron is a genus of mosses belonging to the family Hypnodendraceae.

Species:
 Hypnodendron arborescens (Mitt.) Lindb. 
 Hypnodendron arcuatum (Hedw.) Lindb. ex Mitt. 
 Hypnodendron comosum (Labill.) Mitt. 
 Hypnodendron vitiense Mitt.

References

Bryopsida
Moss genera